The Sanctuary Group may refer to:

 The UK-based organisation which includes Sanctuary Housing
 The UK-based organisation which includes Sanctuary Records